The Museum of Popular Arts of Paraíba (MAPP), also known as "Three Pandeiros Museum", due to its circular shape, is based in the city of Campina Grande, state of Paraíba. It was projected by the architect Oscar Niemeyer, being his last project, and is part of the State University of Paraíba. It was officially opened to public visitation by December 13, 2012.

Museums in Paraíba
Museums established in 2012
2012 establishments in Brazil